National Bank of New Zealand Ltd v Eadie is a cited case in New Zealand regarding the element of inducement for misrepesenation actions.

References

New Zealand contract case law
2003 in New Zealand law
Court of Appeal of New Zealand cases
2003 in case law